Scott Gessner (born 23 February 1973) is a German former professional tennis player.

Gessner, who won the 1989 World Youth Cup (Junior Davis Cup) with West Germany, competed on the professional tour in the 1990s and had a career best singles ranking of 293 in the world.

On the ATP Tour, Gessner qualified for the main draw of two tournaments, the Singapore Open in 1992 and Austrian Open in 1993. He lost his first round matches to Alexander Mronz and Thierry Champion respectively.

References

External links
 
 

1973 births
Living people
German male tennis players
West German male tennis players
People from Bergisch Gladbach
Sportspeople from Cologne (region)
Tennis people from North Rhine-Westphalia